Lambert Belmas (born 11 August 1997) is a French professional rugby league footballer who plays as a  for Toulouse Olympique in the Super League and France at international level. 

He previously played for the Catalans Dragons and FC Lézignan XIII. Belmas has spent time on loan at Saint-Esteve in the Elite One Championship.

Background
Belmas was born in Carcassonne, France.

Career
In 2017 he made his Super League début for Catalans against the Huddersfield Giants.

On 20 Jul 2021 it was confirmed that Lambert had left Catalans after the expiration of his contract

In July 2021 Lezignan announced that they had signed Bélmas.

Belmas signed for Toulouse ahead of the 2022 Super League season, but snapped his achilles heel two days later. Toulouse committed to honouring his contract and helping his recovery from what could be a career ending injury. In June 2022 it was announced that Belmas had signed a two-year deal with Toulouse.

International career
He was selected in the France 9s squad for the 2019 Rugby League World Cup 9s.

References

External links
Catalans Dragons profile
Catalans profile
Super League: Huddersfield Giants 22-29 Catalans Dragons
SL profile
2017 RLWC profile
France profile

1997 births
Living people
AS Saint Estève players
Catalans Dragons players
France national rugby league team players
French rugby league players
Lézignan Sangliers players
People from Carcassonne
Rugby league props
Sportspeople from Aude
Toulouse Olympique players